Lara Croft and the Temple of Osiris is an action-adventure game developed by Crystal Dynamics and published by Square Enix's European subsidiary for Windows, PlayStation 4, Xbox One, Stadia and Nintendo Switch. It is the sequel to the 2010 video game Lara Croft and the Guardian of Light, and the second installment in Lara Croft spin-off series of the Tomb Raider franchise.  The video game was announced at E3 2014 on 9 June.

Gameplay

Like its predecessor, Lara Croft and the Guardian of Light , Lara Croft and the Temple of Osiris is a non-linear "arcade-inspired" action game with a fixed isometric camera, similar to Tomb Raider: The Prophecy for Game Boy Advance. Additionally, the colored circle underneath each player in tandem with the twin-stick control scheme draws total gameplay comparisons to SpongeBob SquarePants: Plankton's Robotic Revenge, Ratchet & Clank: All 4 One, or Contra: Rogue Corps. It features cooperative gameplay, and up to four players can take control of one of four characters, Lara Croft, Carter, Isis or Horus. Each playable character possesses unique weapons and skills. As with some previous installments, Lara retains her dual pistols with infinite ammunition and a grappling hook, which she is able to use to cross gaps.

Plot
Deep in the deserts of Egypt Lara Croft joins forces with rival treasure hunter Carter Bell and imprisoned gods Isis and Horus, to defeat the evil deity Set. Lara and her companions battle the elements of nature through ancient tombs and they must recover the fragments of Osiris to stop Set from enslaving all humanity.

Development
Crystal Dynamics began development on Temple of Osiris in 2013, following the release of Tomb Raider. Nixxes Software provided development support on the game; they had collaborated with Crystal Dynamics on previous Tomb Raider games. The studio completed development in November 2014. That month, Valve and Crystal Dynamics organized a contest for people to produce and submit promotional Tomb Raider themed content for the video game Team Fortress 2. The winning items were revealed on 3 December and were implemented in Team Fortress 2 as rewards for people who pre-purchased Temple of Osiris. Contest winners received a selection of titles from Square Enix's catalogue on Steam.

Release
The game launched on 9 December 2014. The studio released the game's original soundtrack as a free download. A limited Gold Edition of the game was available to purchase in retail; it included a 3-inch Lara figurine, art book, a map of the game's overworld, and a season pass for downloadable content (DLC). The game was released as part of PlayStation Plus free games in August 2015.
The game was released as part of Microsoft Games with Gold free games in May 2017.

Prior to the game's launch, a season pass was announced which would include all future downloadable content for the game. Four downloadable content packs were released in January 2015, three of which contained in-game items and character skins based on Tomb Raider: Legend, and the Deus Ex and Hitman franchises.  These themed packs were previously available as bonuses for pre-ordering the game from specific retailers. The fourth content pack, titled Icy Death, added various in-game items, a tomb featuring new puzzles and enemies, and a Lara Croft character skin based on the 2013 Tomb Raider video game. On 2 February, the Twisted Gears downloadable pack was released featuring a tomb, new in-game items, and a Lara Croft character skin based on the original Tomb Raider game.

Reception

Temple of Osiris received "mixed or average" reviews from critics, according to review aggregator Metacritic. The game received a nomination from the D.I.C.E. Awards for Outstanding Achievement in Original Music Composition.

Dave Rudden of IGN called the game "almost as essential as Lara's third-person execursions", praising the game's creative level design and multiplayer while criticizing its lack of personality in comparison to previous titles. GamesRadar+ gave the game four stars out of five, praising the chaotic co-op, environmental puzzles, and bosses, while criticizing the game's loading issues and lack of readability during cooperative play. Emanuel Maiberg of PC Gamer called the game "much more fun with a friend" while appreciating its clever puzzles and lamenting the game's short runtime which left little room to capitalize on its mechanics. Christian Donlan of Eurogamer complimented the game's utilization of its fairly simple mechanics in order to mask the lack of "first-rate" quality to any one facet of the game. Ben Reeves of Game Informer called the game "largely a retread of Guardian of Light" and deemed its gameplay "standard" while still finding the game fun to play through with friends. GameSpot called the game's pacing "gratifying" in the way it mixed its shooting, locomotion, and problem-solving, while calling out the dated visuals, unrewarding story, and technical issues. Polygon's Philip Kollar noted that in spite of critical issues such as the game's poor loot system and occasionally bad camera, it proved to be an enjoyable experience nevertheless. Push Square gave the game six stars out of ten and lamented the game's lack of personality and memorability while praising its graphics, bosses, and short loading times.

Notes

References

External links

 

2014 video games
Action-adventure games
Crystal Dynamics games
Feral Interactive games
Multiplayer and single-player video games
Nintendo Switch games
PlayStation 4 games
Square Enix games
Stadia games
Tomb Raider spin-off games
Video game sequels
Video games scored by Wilbert Roget, II
Video games set in Egypt
Video games based on Egyptian mythology
Video games developed in the Netherlands
Video games developed in the United States
Windows games
Xbox One games
Nixxes Software games